The Colgate Clock is an octagonal clock facing the Hudson River near Exchange Place in Jersey City, New Jersey.

History
The Colgate Clock once perched atop the Colgate plant at 85-99 Hudson Street in Jersey City, New Jersey. This clock was built in 1924 to replace an earlier clock designed by Colgate engineer Warren Davey and constructed by the Seth Thomas Clock Company for Colgate's centennial in 1906. After it was replaced, the earlier clock was relocated to a Colgate factory in Clarksville, Indiana. The Jersey City clock was maintained by John A. Winters from the 1930s until his retirement in 1976.

As of 2005, the Colgate Clock stands on an otherwise empty lot. The other buildings in the complex were demolished in 1985 when Colgate left. The construction of that building in the early 2000s forced a relocation of the clock southward. At that time, the size of the Colgate advertisement attached to it was reduced to comply with the Hudson River No Billboard law, and Goldman Sachs agreed to maintain the clock.

The clock is a mandatory reporting point for flights below Class B airspace in the Hudson River VFR corridor.

In 2013, the clock was refurbished, outfitted with LED lights, and reinstalled on the waterfront near the Goldman-Sachs tower.

Gallery

See also 

 Colgate Clock (Indiana)
List of public art in Jersey City, New Jersey

References

External links 

 
 
  (original location)

Buildings and structures completed in 1924
Buildings and structures in Jersey City, New Jersey
Clocks in the United States
Colgate-Palmolive
Historic American Engineering Record in New Jersey
Individual signs in the United States
Tourist attractions in Jersey City, New Jersey
Advertising structures
1924 establishments in New Jersey
Public art in Jersey City, New Jersey